High Lonesome is a compilation album by the progressive bluegrass band Country Gentlemen. It's a collection of all recordings for the group's first label, Starday Records.

Track listing
 Backwoods Blues
 Yesterday's Love
 Dixie Lookaway
 It's the Blues
 High Lonesome
 Banjo Hop
 The Church Back Home
 Orange Blossom Fiddle
 Hey, Little Girl
 The Devil's Own
 Rollin' Stone (Waters)
 Nine Pound Hammer (Travis)
 I'll Never Marry
 Travelin' Dobro Blues
 Nobody's Business
 New Freedom Bell (alt. take)
 New Freedom Bell (Osborne)
 The Hills and Home
 A Letter to Tom (Duffey)
 Darling Allalee
 Tomorrow's My Wedding Day
 Helen
 Blue Man
 Rememberance  of You
 Red Rockin' Chair (Christian)
 If That's the Way You Feel
 I Know I've Lost You
 Two Little Boys (trad.)
 Willie Roy, The Cripple Boy
 Sunrise
 Silence or Tears
 Country Concert
 These Men of God  Williams
 Down Where the Still Waters Flow
 Nobody's Business
 Copper Kettle
 Night Walk
 Home Sweet Home
 This Land Is Your Land (Guthrie)
 My Old Kentucky Home (Foster)
 Take This Hammer (trad.)
 Auld Lang Syne (Burns, trad.)
 Goodbye Katy
 Camptown Races (Foster)
 Red River Valley
 Oh, Susannah (trad.)
 Long Journey Home
 500 Miles (West)
 Free Little Bird
 Rose Connelly
 Blowin' in the Wind (Dylan)

Personnel
 Charlie Waller - guitar, vocals
 John Duffey - mandolin, vocals
 Eddie Adcock - banjo, vocals
 Tom Gray - bass, vocals
 Bill Emerson - banjo, vocals
 John Hall - violin
 Carl Nelson - violin
 Ed Ferris - bass
 Pete Kuykendall - bass, banjo, guitar

References

External links
 https://web.archive.org/web/20091215090142/http://www.lpdiscography.com/c/Cgentlemen/cgent.htm

The Country Gentlemen compilation albums
1998 compilation albums
Starday Records compilation albums